The rock ptarmigan (Lagopus muta) is a medium-sized game bird in the grouse family. It is known simply as the ptarmigan in the UK. It is the official bird for the Canadian territory of Nunavut, where it is known as the aqiggiq (ᐊᕿᒡᒋᖅ), and the official game bird for the province of Newfoundland and Labrador. In Japan, it is known as the raichō (雷鳥), which means "thunder bird". It is the official bird of Gifu, Nagano, and Toyama Prefectures and is a protected species nationwide. Unlike many arctic bird species, ptarmigan do not gain substantial mass to hibernate over winter.

Etymology
The ptarmigan's genus name, Lagopus, is derived from Ancient Greek lagos (λαγώς lagṓs), meaning "hare", + pous (πούς poús), "foot", in reference to the bird's feathered legs.

The species name, muta, comes from New Latin and means "mute", referring to the simple croaking song of the male. It was for a long time misspelt mutus, in the erroneous belief that the ending of Lagopus denotes masculine gender. However, as the Ancient Greek term λαγώπους lagṓpous is of feminine gender, and the species name has to agree with that, the feminine muta is correct.

The word ptarmigan comes from the Scottish Gaelic tàrmachan, meaning croaker. The silent initial p was added in 1684 by Robert Sibbald through the influence of Greek, especially pteron (πτερόν pterón), "wing", "feather", or "pinion".

Description
It is smaller than the willow ptarmigan by about ten percent.

The rock ptarmigan is seasonally camouflaged; its feathers moult from white in winter to brown in spring or summer. The breeding male has greyish upper parts with white wings and under parts. In winter, its plumage becomes completely white except for the black outer tail feathers and eye line. It can be distinguished from the winter willow ptarmigan by habitat and markings—the rock ptarmigan prefers higher elevations and more barren habitat. It also has a slender bill and a black eye stripe, which is absent in the willow ptarmigan.

Taxonomy 
The rock ptarmigan has 23 recognized subspecies:

 L. m. atkhensis (Turner, 1882) - Tanaga Island, Adak Island and Atka Island. (west-central of the Aleutian Islands, USA)
 L. m. dixoni (Grinnell, 1909) - Glacier Bay Island and southeastern Alaska
 L. m. evermanni (Elliot D.G., 1896) - Attu Island of the west Aleutian Islands, USA)
 L. m. gerasimovi (Red'kin, 2005) - Karaginskiy Island in Russia
 L. m. helvetica (Thienemann, 1829) - Alps
 L. m. hyperborea (Sundevall, 1845) -  Svalbard (Norway) and Franz Josef Land (Russia)
 L. m. islandorum (Faber, 1822) - Iceland
 L. m. japonica (Clark A.H., 1907) -  Honshu (Japan)
 L. m. kurilensis (Kuroda, 1924) - Kuril Island (Russia)
 L. m. macruros (Schiøler, 1925) - northeastern Greenland
 L. m. millaisi (Hartert, 1923) - Scotland
 L. m. muta (Montin, 1781) - northern Scandinavia to Kola Peninsula (Russia)
 L. m. nadezdae (Serebrovski, 1926) - southern Siberia and northern Mongolia
 L. m. nelsoni (Stejneger, 1884) - Unimak and Unalaska Island (eastern Aleutian Islands, USA) and southern Alaska
 L. m. pleskei (Serebrovski, 1926) - northern Siberia
 L. m. pyrenaica (Hartert, 1921) - central and eastern Pyrenees (France and Spain)
 L. m. reinhardi (Brehm C.L., 1824) - southern Greenland
 L. m. ridgwayi (Stejneger 1884) - Commander Island (Russia)
 L. m. rupestris (Gmelin J.F., 1789) - northern North America
 L. m. saturata (Salomonsen, 1950) - northwestern Greenland
 L. m. townsendi (Elliot D.G., 1896) - Kiska Island, Amchitka, Little Sitkin and Rat Island (western Aleutian Islands, USA)
 L. m. welchi (Brewster, 1885) - Newfoundland (Canada)
 L. m. yunaskensis (Gabrielson & Lincoln, 1951) - Yunaska Island (central Aleutian Islands, USA)

Sounds and displays 
Male rock ptarmigans emit a repertoire of guttural snores and rattles, most often directed to other males during breeding season. On open leks, single or multiple males also carry out displays on the ground and in the air to assert their territory, including chasing other males while flying.

Aerial courtship rituals involve fast forward flight with rapidly-beating wings followed by an upward glide, tail fanned out. The male, at the peak of the display, belts out a rasping "ah-AAH-ah-AAAAH-a-a-a-a-a-a!", with the sung latter part coinciding with a gliding descent afterwards. The sound is often described as that of a stick being pulled rapidly across the slats of a picket fence. 

On the ground, male ptarmigans defend their space by calling and giving chase to other males. Physical conflicts between territorial males rarely occur, while confrontations between the former toward subordinate males are intensified. Other signals via fanning their tails, extended necks, lowered wings and circling a receptive female are also utilized.

Distribution and habitat
The rock ptarmigan is a sedentary species which breeds across Arctic and Subarctic Eurasia and North America (including Greenland) on rocky mountainsides and tundra.  It is widespread in the Arctic Cordillera and is found in isolated populations in the mountains of Norway, Scotland, the Pyrenees, the Alps, Bulgaria, the Urals, the Pamir Mountains, the Altay Mountains, and Japan—where it occurs only in the Japanese Alps and on Mount Haku. Because of the remote habitat in which it lives, it has only a few predators—such as golden eagles—and it can be surprisingly approachable.  It has been introduced to New Zealand, South Georgia, the Kerguelen Islands, and the Crozet Islands.

The small population living on Franz Josef Land in the Russian High Arctic overwinters during the polar night and survives by feeding on rich vegetation on and underneath high cliffs where seabird colonies are located in summer.

During the last ice age, the species was far more widespread in continental Europe.

Ecology

Feeding 
Food sources can vary tremendously depending on the region of their distribution. In Alaska, rock ptarmigans consume aspen buds, dwarf birch and willow buds and catkins as a staple winter diet. They transition their diets over to crowberries and lingonberry shrubs during the spring. The greatest variety in its diet occurs during early summer, when it feeds on willow leaves, as well as the leaves and flowers of Dryas and locoweed. It also feeds on berries, bistort seeds, and birch buds from late summer to autumn. Insects, larvae and snails are eaten by chicks.

Breeding 
Apart from the red eye combs, male rock ptarmigans have no 'distinct' plumage (other than the black eye stripe) that are more typical for other grouse in temperate regions. Studies on other grouses have shown that much variation in comb size and colour exists between the species, and that the comb is used in courtship display and aggressive interactions between males. Many studies have shown that there is a strong correlation between the comb size and the level of testosterone in males; one report from 1981 showed that the amount of testosterone is correlated to aggressiveness against other males.

The male's comb has been the focus of studies regarding sexual selection. Studies of a population of male rock ptarmigans in Scarpa Lake, Nunavut, have shown that during the first year, mating success among males was influenced by comb size and condition, and bigamous males had larger combs than monogamous males. The correlation to size disappeared after the first year, but the correlation to comb condition remained. This is consistent with another study of the same population of L. muta that showed that mating success overall is correlated to comb condition. Exceptions were first-time breeders, in which the size of the comb influenced mating success.

The rock ptarmigan becomes sexually mature at six months of age and commonly has up to six chicks. Because of this high breeding rate, the size of the population is affected very little by factors such as hunting.

Ecophysiology

Energy storage and assimilation 
Rock ptarmigan have a limited capacity for fat storage, which requires overwintering birds to forage frequently. Most of the minuscule mass gained over winter is to the ovary, oviduct and hypertrophy, in preparation for the spring breeding season. Rock ptarmigan maximize assimilation of nutrient poor foods with their elongated ceca. Metabolic requirements can be partially supplemented by fermentation, the energy gain from fermentation alone, however, is not independently significant.

The Svalbard subspecies of rock ptarmigan is the only subspecies that exhibits a significant seasonal mass gain. Larger fat deposits can help them survive during periods of low food availability. However, this alone is not an adequate source of energy to survive during winter. Locomotion appears to have no energetic cost in these birds. This adaptation is key for a species that must move frequently to forage. Fat assimilation in these birds is correlated to changes in liver weight. Most rock ptarmigan have no more than 20 grams of adipose tissue year round. Without food, these reserves can supplement energy for 2 days. The Svalbard rock ptarmigan, however, gains about 100 grams of adipose tissue. This can serve as an energy source for up to 10 days of starvation.

The Svalbard subspecies inhabits the northern extent of the rock ptarmigans range. During winter, food availability is lower in Svalbard than in other parts of their range, which accounts for the necessary increased fat reserves not found in other sub populations.

In culture
Rock ptarmigan meat is a popular part of festive meals in Icelandic cuisine. Hunting of rock ptarmigans was banned in Iceland in 2003 and 2004 due to its declining population. Hunting has been allowed again since 2005, but is restricted to selected days, which are revised yearly and all trade of rock ptarmigan is illegal.

In Thomas Bewick's A History of British Birds (1797) the species is named as "White Grouse" with alternatives "White Game, or Ptarmigan". The birds feed, records Bewick, "on the wild productions of the hills, which sometimes give the flesh a bitter, but not unpalatable taste: it is dark coloured, and has somewhat the flavour of the hare."

Provincial bird 
The rock ptarmigan is the official territorial bird of Nunavut, Canada. Its Inuktitut name is ᐊᕐᑭᒡᒋᖅ ᐊᑕᔪᓕᒃ, aqiggiq atajulik. It is the official game bird of Newfoundland and Labrador.

References

External links 

Stamps: Rock Ptarmigan (worldwide); with world RangeMap
Ptarmigan videos, photos & sounds on the Internet Bird Collection
Ptarmigan RSPB
Rock Ptarmigan-Lagopus muta photo gallery VIREO

Montin (1776). Phys. Sälsk. Kandl. 1: 155.

rock ptarmigan
rock ptarmigan
Holarctic birds
rock ptarmigan
rock ptarmigan
Articles containing video clips
Game birds